Wildberg may refer to:

Wildberg, Baden-Württemberg, a town in the district of Calw, Baden-Württemberg, Germany
Wildberg, Mecklenburg-Vorpommern, a municipality in the district of Demmin, Mecklenburg-Vorpommern, Germany
Wildberg, Switzerland, a municipality in the canton of Zürich, Switzerland
Wildberg (Rätikon), 2788 m high mountain in the Rätikon mountain range, Vorarlberg, Austria
117506 Wildberg, an asteroid named after Wildberg in Baden-Württemberg

People with the last name Wildberg:
John Wildberg (1902–1959), American copyright attorney
Heiko Wildberg (born 1952), German politician

See also
 Waldberg (disambiguation)
 Waldburg (disambiguation)
 Wildburg (disambiguation)
 Wildenburg (disambiguation)